The 1938 Tour de France was the 32nd edition of the Tour de France, one of cycling's Grand Tours. The Tour began in Paris with a flat stage on 5 July, and Stage 10c occurred on 17 July with a flat stage to Montpellier. The race finished in Paris on 31 July.

Stage 1
5 July 1938 – Paris to Caen,

Stage 2
6 July 1938 – Caen to Saint-Brieuc,

Stage 3
7 July 1938 – Saint-Brieuc to Nantes,

Stage 4a
8 July 1938 – Nantes to La Roche-sur-Yon,

Stage 4b
8 July 1938 – La Roche-sur-Yon to La Rochelle,

Stage 4c
8 July 1938 – La Rochelle to Royan,

Rest day 1
9 July 1938 – Royan

Stage 5
10 July 1938 – Royan to Bordeaux,

Stage 6a
11 July 1938 – Bordeaux to Arcachon,

Stage 6b
11 July 1938 – Arcachon to Bayonne,

Stage 7
12 July 1938 – Bayonne to Pau,

Rest day 2
13 July 1938 –- Pau

Stage 8
14 July 1938 – Pau to Luchon,

Rest day 3
15 July 1938 – Luchon

Stage 9
16 July 1938 – Luchon to Perpignan,

Stage 10a
17 July 1938 – Perpignan to Narbonne,

Stage 10b
17 July 1938 – Narbonne to Béziers,  (ITT)

Stage 10c
17 July 1938 – Béziers to Montpellier,

References

1938 Tour de France
Tour de France stages